Mary from Beijing aka. Awakening (夢醒時分) is a 1992 Hong Kong film written and directed by Sylvia Chang.

Cast and roles
 Lawrence Ah Mon - Immigration Officer
 Kenny Bee - Wong Kwok-wai
 Cynthia Cheung - Elizabeth
 David Chiang - Yip
 Gong Li - Ma Li (Mary)
 Jan Lamb - Messenger
 Wilson Lam - Peter
 Pao Fong - Speaker at dedication
 Melvin Wong - Stanley
 Yuen King-Tan - Mahjong player
 Zhu Mu - Peter's father

External links
 IMDB entry
 HK cinemagic entry

Hong Kong romantic drama films
Films directed by Sylvia Chang
1990s Hong Kong films